CSS-in-JS is a styling technique by which JavaScript is used to style components. When this JavaScript is parsed, CSS is generated (usually as a <style> element) and attached into the DOM. It enables the abstraction of CSS to the component level itself, using JavaScript to describe styles in a declarative and maintainable way. There are multiple implementations of this concept in the form of libraries such as

 Emotion
 Styled Components
 JSS
 Tailwind CSS

These libraries allow the creation of styled components using tagged template literals. For example, using styled components in a React project would look like the following:

import styled from 'styled-components';
// Create a component that renders a <p> element with blue text
const BlueText = styled.p`
  color: blue;
`;

<BlueText>My blue text</BlueText>

Some outcomes that may be achieved through CSS-in-JS can not be obtained using traditional CSS techniques. It is possible to make the styles dynamic in line with just a few conditional statements. Programmers may also write more modular code, with CSS being encapsulated in the same block as the programmer's JavaScript, scoping it to that module only.

Industry use 
CSS-in-JS is used by Reddit, Patreon, Target, Atlassian, Vogue, GitHub and Coinbase.

References 

Cascading Style Sheets
JavaScript
Web design
World Wide Web Consortium standards